Wirayi Dzawanda "Willie" Musarurwa (24 November 1927 – 3 April 1990) was a Zimbabwean journalist.

Musarurwa studied at Princeton University from 1961 to 1962.

He opposed the policies of both the minority white government and later the majority black government. He was imprisoned for over 10 years without trial. Later, he became chief editor of Zimbabwe's leading Sunday newspaper, The Sunday Mail, but was subsequently removed from this position by orders of President Robert Mugabe for being "overly critical of the government.

Death
Musarurwa died at the age of 62, while having lunch with Ambassador Steven Rhodes of the United States. He was survived by his wife, Elizabeth, and seven children.

References

1927 births
1990 deaths
Zimbabwean journalists
Zimbabwean newspaper editors
Princeton University alumni
20th-century Zimbabwean writers
20th-century journalists